William Goforth (1731–1807), also called Judge William Goforth and Major William Goforth, was a member of the Committee of One Hundred and Committee of Safety in New York City, an officer of the New York Line during the American Revolutionary War, and was a member of the New York State Assembly after the war. He was one of the earliest immigrants to the Cincinnati area, where he was named a judge and was elected to the territorial legislature.

Life in East
William Goforth was born in Philadelphia, Pennsylvania on April 1, 1731. He married Catharine Meeks in New York City on May 18, 1760. He was a member of the Committee of Safety and Committee of One Hundred early in the American Revolutionary War. He joined the 1st Regiment New York Line as a Captain on June 28, 1775 under Colonel Alexander McDougall, was a Major, 5th Regiment New York Line, June 26, 1776, and resigned July 6, 1776. He served in the Invasion of Canada and the Battle of Three Rivers.

Goforth was elected to the New York State Assembly for the 8th and 9th New York State Legislature, serving from 1784 to 1786.

Life in West
Goforth was among the earliest settlers in Southwest Ohio, when he settled at Columbia, now a neighborhood of Cincinnati, in the Northwest Territory in early 1789. On January 4, 1790, Governor Arthur St. Clair established Hamilton County and named Goforth one of three Judges of the Court of Common Pleas and Justices of the Court of General Quarter Sessions of the Peace.

Like other Democratic-Republicans in Ohio, statehood became important to William Goforth. To that end, he along with Thomas Goudy, David Zeigler, Robert McClure, Aaron Caldwell, William McMillan and Robert Benham formed a Committee of Correspondence in 1797 to share this desire with other counties in the Northwest Territory.

He was elected one of the Hamilton County representatives in the Northwest Territory House of Representatives for the First Territorial Legislature, which met from September 16 to December 19, 1799 at Cincinnati, and from November 3 to December 9, 1800 at Chillicothe.

On March 3, 1801, the Congress passed , titled "An Act giving a right of pre-emption to certain persons who have contracted with John Cleves Symmes, or his associates, for lands lying between the Miami rivers, in the territory of the United States northwest of the Ohio" Section 4 of this act called for the President to appoint two commissioners to "ascertain the rights of persons claiming the benefits of this act. Goforth and John Reily were named by the President to be these commissioners.

In 1802, Goforth ran as a Democratic-Republican to be a delegate to the convention that would draft a constitution for the proposed state of Ohio. He was elected to the convention, which met from November 1 to November 29, 1802. He voted against ever allowing slavery in the state, and was in the minority in voting for suffrage and other civil rights for black people.

After Ohio became a state, an election was held for Ohio's at-large congressional district in 1803. Goforth finished in fifth place. Either Goforth, or his son, also William was a Presidential elector in 1804, voting for Thomas Jefferson.

Goforth died November 2, 1807 at Columbia. He was buried there, but re-interred at Spring Grove Cemetery. His tombstone reads: "Here rest the remains of Wm. Goforth who was born in Philadelphia, Pa., Apr. 1, 1731: Emigrated to Ohio in 1788: Assisted in forming her Constitution and was one of her first territorial judges: An officer in the Revolutionary War. He sacrificed everything for its success. He died Nov. 2, A.D. 1807 in the 76th year of his age."

Notes

References

1731 births
1807 deaths
Burials at Spring Grove Cemetery
Continental Army officers from New York (state)
Members of the New York State Assembly
Northwest Territory House of Representatives
Ohio Constitutional Convention (1802)
Ohio Democratic-Republicans
Politicians from Cincinnati
Politicians from New York City